Bkulangriil is a village in Ngeremlengui, Palau. It consists of a roughly linear settlement, farmland, and a jetty.

The community is distinguishable for its heavily decorated church.

Population

References 

Populated places in Palau
Ngeremlengui